Mannava Balayya (9 April 1930 – 9 April 2022) was an Indian actor, writer, director and producer in Telugu cinema. He acted in 300 films.

Early life and career 
Mannava Balayya, was born at Chavupadu, Amaravathi mandalam, Guntur district to Mannava Annapurnamma, Guravayya Chowdary. He studied Engineering B.E. (mechanical) in Guindy Engineering College, Chennai. Inspired by the drama during his college days, Balayya ventured into movies with guidance from Tapi Chanakya.

He made his debut as an actor with Ethuku Pai Ethu, a social film directed by Tapi Chanakya and made by Sarathi Studios. Films such as Parvati Kalyanam established him as an actor. He acted in nearly three hundred films and established Amrutha Films in 1970.

He penned a play, Nalupu Telupu, later made into Chelleli Kapuram, for which he received the Gold Nandi Award from the Andhra Pradesh Government. He also penned films, including Neramu Siksha and Annadammula Katha. He was awarded the Raghupathi Venkaiah Award in 2012.

Filmography 
This is partial filmography of M. Balayya. Please help by expanding it.

Actor

Producer

Director

Story writer

Awards
 Nandi Award for Second Best Story Writer - Oorukichchina Maata (1981)

See also 
 Raghupathi Venkaiah Award

References

External links 
 

1930 births
2022 deaths
Indian male film actors
Male actors in Telugu cinema
People from Guntur district
Telugu screenwriters
Telugu film directors
Telugu film producers
Male actors from Andhra Pradesh
Film producers from Andhra Pradesh
Film directors from Andhra Pradesh
20th-century Indian male actors
21st-century Indian male actors
20th-century Indian film directors
Screenwriters from Andhra Pradesh